Enyu Valchev Dimov (4 January 1936 – 15 February 2014) was a lightweight freestyle wrestler from Bulgaria. He competed at the 1960, 1964 and 1968 Olympics and won a bronze, gold and silver medal, respectively. At the World championships, he won gold in 1962, silvers in 1959 and 1969 and bronze in 1967, while finishing fourth in 1965, fifth in 1966 and sixth in 1963. At the European Championships Valchev won gold medals in 1968 and 1969 and a bronze in 1967. In 1962 Valchev was selected as Bulgarian Sportsperson of the Year.

After finishing his wrestling career, Valchev worked as a coach, and was the head coach of the Bulgarian junior team until his retirement in 1990. In 2005 he was elected to the FILA International Wrestling Hall of Fame.

References

1936 births
2014 deaths
Olympic wrestlers of Bulgaria
Wrestlers at the 1960 Summer Olympics
Wrestlers at the 1964 Summer Olympics
Wrestlers at the 1968 Summer Olympics
Bulgarian male sport wrestlers
Olympic gold medalists for Bulgaria
Olympic silver medalists for Bulgaria
Olympic bronze medalists for Bulgaria
Olympic medalists in wrestling
People from Radnevo
World Wrestling Championships medalists
Medalists at the 1968 Summer Olympics
Medalists at the 1964 Summer Olympics
Medalists at the 1960 Summer Olympics
20th-century Bulgarian people
21st-century Bulgarian people